Charles Lundy Lewis (March 8, 1852 – February 11, 1936) was an American jurist.

Biography
Born in Ottawa, Illinois, Lewis graduated from Oberlin College in 1876. He then studied law and was admitted to the Illinois bar in Chicago, Illinois in 1879. He practiced law in Fergus Falls, Minnesota and served as county attorney for Otter Tail County, Minnesota. In 1891, Lewis moved to Duluth, Minnesota and continued to practice law. In 1893, Lewis served as a Minnesota district court judge. Lewis served on the Minnesota Supreme Court from 1900 to 1912. He then moved to Los Angeles, California to practice law, and died there in 1936.

Notes

1852 births
1936 deaths
People from Ottawa, Illinois
Politicians from Los Angeles
Politicians from Duluth, Minnesota
People from Fergus Falls, Minnesota
Oberlin College alumni
California lawyers
Illinois lawyers
Minnesota state court judges
Justices of the Minnesota Supreme Court